The 1960–61 Spartan League season was the 43rd in the history of Spartan League. The league consisted of 15 teams.

League table

The division featured 15 teams, 12 from last season and 3 new teams:
 Petters Sports, from Surrey Senior League
 Crown and Manor, from Parthenon League
 Kingsbury Town, from Parthenon League

References

1960–61
9